Seven Springs of Apink is the debut extended play by the girl group Apink. It was released on April 19, 2011. The songs "I Don't Know" and "It Girl" were used to promote the EP.

Release 
Promotions for "I Don't Know" began on April 21, 2011, on M! Countdown.

Track listing

Charts

Sales and certifications

References 

Apink albums
2011 debut EPs
Dance-pop EPs
Korean-language EPs
Cube Entertainment EPs